Hürben, today the eastern part of Krumbach in Bavarian Swabia, was an independent village before it was incorporated into the neighbouring town of Krumbach in the year 1902. The Kammel was in most parts the border between Krumbach and Hürben.

History 
Hürben was found around the year 1000. Until 1805 Hürben was part of the Margraviate of Burgau, which was part of the Habsburg Further Austria. In the year 1805 Hürben became Bavarian by the Peace of Pressburg. In the year 1902 Hürben became part of Krumbach, which receive seven years before its  town  charter. Until the time of the Third Reich Hürben had a high percentage of Jewish residents in comparison to the Bavarian average.

Gallery 

Villages in Bavaria
Populated places in Günzburg (district)